This list of mines in Mongolia is subsidiary to the list of mines article and lists working, defunct and future mines in the country and is organised by the primary mineral output. For practical purposes stone, marble and other quarries may be included in this list.

Coal and iron

Iron

Coal

Metals

Copper

Gold

Tungsten

References

Mongolia